The 2004–05 Campionato Sammarinese di Calcio season was the 20th season since its establishment. It was contested by 15 teams, and F.C. Domagnano won the championship.

Regular season

Group A

Group B

Results
All teams play twice against the teams within their own group and once against the teams from the other group.

Championship playoffs

First round

Second round

Third round

Fourth round

Semifinal

Final

References
San Marino - List of final tables (RSSSF)

Campionato Sammarinese di Calcio
San Marino
1